Christian O. Aagaard (born 22 January 1937 in Hjallerup) is a Danish politician, who was a member of the Folketing for the Conservative People's Party from 1984 to 1994 and again from 1997 to 1998.

Political career
Aagaard was a member of Silkeborg Municipality's municipal council, as well as a member of the county council of Århus County.

Aagaard was a candidate for the Conservative People's Party from 1983 and was first elected into parliament at the 1984 Danish general election. He was reelected in 1987, 1988 and 1990. He did not get elected in the 1994 election, but became a substitute for the Conservative People's Party in the Århus constituency. He entered parliament as a substitute member from 29 October to 22 November 1996. On 1 May 1997 Hans Peter Clausen resigned his seat, and Aagaard entered parliament, taking over Clausen's seat.

References

External links 
 Biography on the website of the Danish Parliament (Folketinget)

1937 births
Living people
People from Brønderslev Municipality
Danish municipal councillors
Conservative People's Party (Denmark) politicians
Members of the Folketing 1984–1987
Members of the Folketing 1987–1988
Members of the Folketing 1988–1990
Members of the Folketing 1990–1994
Members of the Folketing 1994–1998